The Sacred Headwaters is a large subalpine drainage basin centred around Klappan Mountain of the Klappan Range in northern British Columbia. It is the source of three wild salmon rivers: the Skeena River, Nass River, and Stikine River. It is also referred to as the Klappan Valley, although the Klappan—a tributary of the Stikine River—is only one of the area's watersheds. Local Tahltan people call the area , which is loosely translated as "headwaters".

Ecology
The area has a significant population of grizzly bears, stone sheep, caribou, wolves, and goats. Salmon swim over 400 kilometres from the Pacific Ocean to spawn in the upper reaches of the river.

Industrial development
The Sacred Headwaters is rich in mineral and energy resources, particularly coal and coalbed methane. Several industrial development projects were planned for the area, including Fortune Minerals' open-pit Klappan Coal Mine and Royal Dutch Shell's Klappan Coalbed Methane Project. Shell Canada's website in 2009 reported to be conducting several environmental baseline studies being carried out within the Klappan tenure area.

Klappan Coal Mine
Fortune Coal Limited (FCL) entered on 13 July 2011 into an unincorporated joint venture with Posco Canada (POSCAN).  The venture, an 80–20 split, is based on mineral rights held by FCL and finances provided by POSCAN.  FCL is 100% controlled by Fortune Minerals Limited, an Ontario-based company that trades on the TSX Venture Exchange.  POSCAN, which has so far contributed $30 million to the project, is a subsidiary of one of the world's largest steel producers, and has strong ties to the Government of South Korea. The existing financial resources of the FML were not sufficient to bring any of its properties into commercial production as of 2012. The Klappan project was estimated to need $789 million to begin production, and to generate substantially less than 1,000 jobs.  FML called this the "Arctos Anthracite Project".

The government of British Columbia, in whose jurisdiction the mineral rights are held, planned on 20 September 2013 to dispatch a minister to deal with the First Nations' blockade of the project.  Some First Nations groups committed to defending the Sacred Headwaters. 
"We dare Fortune to get us arrested," said group spokesperson Rhoda Quock. “We have cameras here. We will make sure the world knows what’s going on.” On 23 September 2013 Quock was interviewed on CBC's As It Happens, and asked Fortune to obtain an injunction.  The CEO of FML explained on 24 September 2013 in a radio interview that the company would not seek an injunction, and that they would let the BC government mediate a settlement instead.

Klappan Coalbed Methane Project

The Klappan Coalbed Methane Project was a proposal by Shell Canada to develop a coalbed methane project in the Sacred Headwaters. In 2004, the British Columbia government granted Royal Dutch Shell a  tenure for coalbed methane development.  It is accessed by road via the abandoned BC Rail grade, which intersects British Columbia Highway 37 south of Iskut.  As of summer 2008, Shell's project was in the exploration phase.  Shell drilled three exploratory wells in 2004 and was preparing to drill 14 additional wells in 2008, 8 of which were proposed for the headwaters of the Skeena River. If developed, Shell's project would have entailed a network of gas wells connected by roads and pipelines, as well as a pipeline to deliver the gas to market. Shell disclosed neither how many wells will be necessary to make the project economically viable nor route options for the delivery pipeline.  The Klappan Coalbed Methane Project met with opposition by both First Nations groups and non-governmental organizations.  The Pembina Institute, an environmentalist think-tank, released a report on the potential impacts of the Klappan Coalbed Methane Project on wild salmon, calling it a "risky experiment" as commercial coalbed methane production has never been attempted in a salmon-bearing watershed. On December 18, 2012, the B.C. government announced that Shell Canada would relinquish its tenure on the land, and that oil and gas development would be banned in the Sacred Headwaters.

Developments since 2015
In April 2015, the Government of British Columbia bought all coal licences in the area around Mount Klappan, halting development for the foreseeable future. At the same time, the Tahltan First Nation and provincial government began working on a long-term plan for the Sacred Headwaters.

The campaign to protect the Sacred Headwaters from industrial development was profiled in the 2022 documentary film The Klabona Keepers.

References

External links
 Sacred Headwaters portal site
 Skeena Watershed Conservation Coalition

Tahltan
Stikine Country
Politics of British Columbia
Environmental issues in Canada
Drainage basins of the Pacific Ocean
Watersheds of Canada
Watersheds of Alaska
Unconventional gas
Indigenous politics in Canada
Environmental policy in Canada
Land use
2010s in Canada
2010s in the environment